is a memoir by Haruki Murakami in which he writes about his interest and participation in long-distance running. The book is translated by Philip Gabriel. Murakami started running in the early 1980s and since then has competed in over twenty marathons and an ultramarathon.

The book's title was inspired by Raymond Carver's collection of short stories entitled What We Talk About When We Talk About Love.

External links
Interview with Murakami from Runner's World

Reviews
Review from The New York Times 
Review from The New York Sun
 Review from The Los Angeles Times
Review from The Times 
Review from The Christian Science Monitor
Review from The Daily Telegraph
Review from The Daily Telegraph

2007 non-fiction books
Books by Haruki Murakami
Alfred A. Knopf books
Running books
Marathon running

Reference